Fruitcake Bluff is a steep rock outcrop in the form of a bluff  high, extending in a northeast–southwest direction for  in the southeast portion of Thompson Spur, in the Daniels Range, Victoria Land, Antarctica. It was recorded by United States Antarctic Research Program geologists C.C. Plummer and R.S. Babcock, who made a geological reconnaissance of Daniels Range in December 1981. It was descriptively named from the prevalent intrusive rock on the bluff which has the appearance in color and texture of a fruitcake. The bluff lies situated on the Pennell Coast, a portion of Antarctica lying between Cape Williams and Cape Adare.

References

Cliffs of Victoria Land
Pennell Coast